Acht (Dutch for eight) was a Belgian digital television channel, owned by the Concentra group.

The channel was provided by Telenet, Belgacom TV, Numericable and TV Vlaanderen Digitaal. The channel broadcasts a different theme every night. Acht has a signed deal with HBO to broadcast its series.

In 2016 the TV channel was sold to Medialaan (now DPG Media), who announced it would change the name to CAZ. In August 2020, it eventually transforms itself in VTM4.

References

External links
 Acht TV

Television channels in Flanders
Defunct television channels in Belgium
Television channels and stations established in 2009
Television channels and stations disestablished in 2016
2009 establishments in Belgium
2016 disestablishments in Belgium